Schwartz's antthrush (Chamaeza turdina), also known as the scalloped antthrush, is a species of bird in the family Formicariidae. It is found in humid highland forest in the Andes of Colombia and the Coastal Range in Venezuela. The Colombian population belongs to the nominate subspecies, while the Venezuelan belongs to chionogaster. Long included as a subspecies of the rufous-tailed antthrush, it was only recognized as a separate species in 1992. It takes its name from ornithologist Paul A. Schwartz, who was the first to realize how strikingly different its song sounds compared to that of the rufous-tailed antthrush. The song of Schwartz's antthrush is closer to that of the cryptic antthrush.

References

Schwartz's antthrush
Birds of the Colombian Andes
Birds of the Venezuelan Coastal Range
Schwartz's antthrush
Taxonomy articles created by Polbot